FEAF may refer to:

 Federal Enterprise Architecture Framework
 Far East Air Force, which may refer to:
 Far East Air Force (Royal Air Force)
 Far East Air Force (United States)